Seyed Hossein Ebrahimian (also Mollaghasemi, 15 March 1933 – 25 April 2022) was a wrestler from Iran. Competing as a freestyle featherweight he won a silver medal at the 1957 World Championships. He then changed to Greco-Roman wrestling and placed fifth-sixth at the world championships in 1961–62. He competed at the 1960 and 1964 Summer Olympics and shared sixth place in 1960.

References

External links
 

1933 births
2022 deaths
Iranian male sport wrestlers
Olympic wrestlers of Iran
Wrestlers at the 1960 Summer Olympics
Wrestlers at the 1964 Summer Olympics
Sportspeople from Tehran
20th-century Iranian people
21st-century Iranian people
World Wrestling Championships medalists